The Farm Forestry Toolbox is a collection of computer programs, referred to as 'Tools', intended to be used by farm forest owners and managers to aid decision making.  The Toolbox includes a set of simple 'Hand Tools'; conversion of measurements and map co-ordinates; measuring the volume of stacked logs, slope, basal area; and a survey tool. A second set of more complex tools or 'Power Tools'; can be used to estimate site productivity (growth rate), volume and value of wood grown for individual trees, at the coupe or stand level and forest estate level.

Background

Farm Forestry is a term used in Australia to describe the use of private land to grow wood products and provide a number of other ecosystem services. Private land is land registered under Torrens title and leasehold land, usually leased from the government. Farm Forestry is defined as 'establishment and/or management of trees or forests on agricultural landscapes for commercial, aesthetic and/or environmental reasons  The term 'Farm Forestry', as used in Australia, encompasses Afforestation, Agroforestry, Analog forestry, Buffer strip, Plantation, Reforestation, Riparian-zone restoration, Silvopasture and Windbreak.

Support for Farm Forestry is provided by both the Australian Government  and State governments.  In 2005 the Australian government released a Farm Forestry - National Action Statement.

Governments have provided grants, funded research, provided advice (extension) and tax incentives to encourage landowners to adopt Farm Forestry.

Rationale

The 'Tools' were initially developed to make routine tasks easier. For example, using the 'Stocking Tool' it is possible to calculated the number of trees required, given a row and in-row spacing, and area to be planted.

The 'Health Tool' has a similar approach.  A user can diagnose tree health problems using the Toolbox, replacing the need to use reference texts, or having to enlist the assistance of a forest health expert.

Forest researchers have developed a number growth models, but these models are often difficult to access and use.  The Toolbox was developed to ensure that growth models were available to farm forestry owners and managers, able to be used to inform decision making, and provide a link between the growth models outputs and financial modelling tools.

The 'Stand Manager' is more complex and used to calculate net present value, internal rates of return, and wood and product yield.  This Tool is used to explore management scenarios, and the resultant financial return and wood yield. A user of the 'Stand Manger' is required to create log grade sets (log specifications), regimes (sequence of events over the life of the rotation detailing events, including timing and costs/returns), as input data.  This Tool can also use the output from 'Site Productivity' and 'Inventory' tools.

Using the Toolbox
Users can 'customise' the Toolbox by using the 'Editors' and/or manual input of key data, such as growth rate.  This means the Toolbox can be used for any type of planted forest (windbreak or shelterbelt, agroforestry, woodlot, or plantation), and can be used for existing planted forest or an area being considered for planting. 

Extensive user support is available for the Toolbox, with Manuals and Workbooks provided. In addition to 'On Screen Help', 'Help' panels are displayed in many Tools.  The Toolbox includes in the 'Editors' sample Log Grade sets, Regimes and Biomass sets, that a user can modify.

The 'Video Help' is available on the YouTube channel Farm Forestry Toolbox.

Toolbox Tools

Development 

Dr Andy Warner, then an employee of Private Forests Tasmania, conceived the concept of the Farm Forestry Toolbox in 1996. He obtained funding support for, and managed, the development of versions 1 to 5.  Originally the Toolbox was promoted as a User Friendly PC Tree Modelling Package (versions 1 and 2).  Dr Warner also conducted training courses around Australia and overseas. Now living in Thailand, he continues to support the ongoing development and promotion of the current Toolbox for wider use internationally.

Adrian Goodwin, initially as an employee of Forestry Tasmania and since 2003 as principal consultant of Bushlogic, is responsible for most of the concepts and code, and continues to expand the functionality of the Toolbox package. He has presented the Toolbox to forest growers, foresters and educators in Australia and overseas.

The Toolbox Inventory tool is recognised in the A Standard for Valuing Commercial Forests in Australia, as a suitable tool to undertake inventory for the purposes of the Standard.

Access to Toolbox
The Toolbox was originally provide free of charge via CD. A free download is available from the Toolbox website.

The Toolbox was included in the 2009 CSIRO publication Agroforestry for Natural Resource Management.

A Workshop - The Farm Forestry Toolbox - Australia's most versatile and widely used forestry software, was conducted as part of the 8th Australia and the New Zealand Institute of Forestry (ANZIF) Conference (2015).

Farm Forestry Toolbox version 5

In 2008, Toolbox was completely re-written in VB.NET 2005 implementing .NET Framework 2. This has resulted in an improved user interface, and provided an opportunity to streamline code.

Version 5 of the Toolbox is sensitive to international currency and date formatting.  It is possible to set defaults for anywhere in the world and select any currency. Non-English help and instructions can be displayed by populating appropriately named folders with translated .RTF files. The Toolbox developers are in the process of “internationalising” some of the Toolbox programs so that all labels and headings can be translated to non-English.

A number of enhancements were made to Version 5.1, and labelled as Farm Forestry Toolbox Version 5.1 - Carbon Ready.  These enhancements allow a user to model biomass components and explore changes in accumulation of biomass due to climate change and changes in growth rates for planted forests.  Carbon planting regimes were developed and modifications to the 'Stand Manager' allows a user to explore options to use planted forests for carbon storage.

The Toolbox is able to be used for a wide range of plantation species in Australia, including mallee oil  and sandalwood. It is also suitable for inventory in teak plantations in Southeast Asia.

Version 5 contains 50 taper models, 15 empirical growth models, and 4 process-based growth models (3 parameterisations of AGGRO  and an adaption of 3PG  for oil mallee). AGGRO calibrations for P.radiata and E.nitens are currently unavailable and awaiting re-calibration.

It is reported that the Toolbox is being used in universities in Germany, Thailand, Portugal, Ireland, Spain and Australia.

Farm Forestry Toolbox Versions

General version history

Recent version history for Version 5.x.x

Contribution to Toolbox from researchers and others

The Toolbox is a means of ensuring research output is made available for forest owners and managers.  The following summarises the contribution from researchers and others, and the organizations they worked for when the contribution was made  (Items available as part of the Toolbox download).

3PG-FFT - (in Site Productivity and Stand Manager) - developed by Joe Landsberg and Richard Waring  with additional contributions by Peter Sands and CSIRO.

AGGRO - (in Site Productivity and Stand Manager) - developed by Michael Battaglia of Ensis and CRC-Forestry with support for the Joint Venture Agro-Forestry Program (Rural Industries Research and Development Corporation/Land & Water Australia/Forest Wood Products Research Development Corporation/Murray Darling Basin Commission (Authority) - joint venture) (Project CPF-1A).

Biometric Models - Developed and programmed by Adrian Goodwin; Eric Keady (Forestry Plantations Queensland); Steve Candy (Forestry Tasmania); Jerry Vanclay (Southern Cross University); Yue Wang and Thomas Baker (School of Forest and Ecosystem Science, University of Melbourne) with the support of the Forests and Wood Products Research and Development Corporation and the Department of Primary Industries (Victoria); and Justin Wong (Department of Sustainability and Environment Victoria).

Forest Health Keys - Software concept and original programming by Tim Osborn (Forestry Tasmania).  Keys prepared by Tim Wardlaw (Forestry Tasmania).  Additional unpublished information, advice  and comment were provided by the following specialists: Dick Bashford, Jane Elek, Andrew Walsh, Paul Adams (Forestry Tasmania); David de Little, Tim Hingston (Gunns Ltd); Dugald Close, Phil Smethurst, Clare McArthur, Caroline Mohammed, Geoff Allen, Marina Hurley (Cooperative Research Centre for Sustainable Production Forestry); Andy Warner.  Unless otherwise acknowledged, photographs used in keys were taken by staff of Forestry Tasmania. Robyn Doyle provided many photographs taken specifically for use in this key.

Specialised models and data - Oil Mallee Production - Based on a concept by Alan Herbert, Senior Economist with AgWest and using growth models developed by John Bartle, Manager of the Farm Forestry Unit at  Department of Conservation and Land Management (Western Australia); and Adrian Goodwin. Data provided by Kim Brooksbank (AgWest, Farm Forestry and Revegetation group), Dan Wildy (University of Western Australia) and the Future Farm Industries Cooperative Research Centre. Sandalwood Production - Data provided by Kim Brooksbank.

Citation of literature where Toolbox used to model outcomes
The Toolbox has been used to model financial and wood yield and results reported in peer reviewed publications, theses, and reports and proceedings.

Peer reviewed publications
 Battaglia, Michael. and Sands, Peter. J., 1997.  Modelling site productivity of Eucalyptus globulus in response to climate and site factors.  Australian Journal of Plant Physiology, 24 (6): 831 - 850.
 Kube, P. D., & Raymond, C. A., 2005.  Breeding to Minimise the Effects of Collapse in Eucalyptus nitens Sawn Timber.  Forest Genetics 12(1):23-24, 2005.
 Wood M.J., McLarin M.L., Volker P.W, and Syme M., 2009. Management of eucalypt plantations for profitable sawlog production in Tasmania, Australia.  Tasforests Vol. 18 p 117 November 2009.
 Warner A.J., Monton Jamroenprucksa and Ladawan Puangchit 2016. Development and evaluation of teak (Tectona grandis) taper equations in northern Thailand..  Agriculture and Natural Resources

Theses
 Baral, H. Ecosystem Goods and Services in Production Landscapes in South-Eastern Australia. Submitted in total fulfillment of the requirements of the degree of Doctor of Philosophy, Department of Forest and Ecosystem Science, Melbourne School of Land and Environment, The University of Melbourne. October 2013.
 Smith, A., The Development of Strategies for the Management and Research of Foliar Pathogens on Eucalypt Plantations: Using Mycosphaerellaas a Case Study. Submitted in fulfillment of the requirements for the degree of Doctor of Philosophy, School of Agricultural Science, University of Tasmania, and CRC for Forestry and Ensis Forest Biosecurity and Protection, Hobart, Tasmania, Australia. June 2006.
 Kube, P.D, Genetic Improvement of Wood Properties of Eucalyptus nitens - Breeding to improve solid wood and pulp properties.. Submitted in fulfillment of the requirements for the degree of Doctor of Philosophy, University of Tasmania. April 2005
 Candy, S. G.,  Predictive Models for Integrated Pest Management of the Leaf Beetle Chrysophtharta bimaculata in Eucalyptus nitens Plantations in Tasmania. Submitted in fulfillment of the requirements for the Degree of Doctor of Philosophy, University of Tasmania, and Cooperative Research Centre for Sustainable Production Forestry, Hobart, Tasmania, Australia. December 1999.
 Warner, A.J. Development and Evaluation of Teak (Tectona grandis L.f.) Taper Equations in Northern Thailand. Submitted in fulfillment of the requirements for the Degree of Doctor of Philosophy. Faculty of Forestry, Kasetsart University. Bangkok, Thailand. 2016.

Reports and conference proceedings

2002
 Osborn, T., and Warner, A., 2002. A Tree Health Diagnostic Tool for Farm Forestry Toolbox 4. Australian Forest Grower, Vol. 25, No. 3, Spring 2002: 16. 
 Wood, M.J., Volker, P.W. and Syme, M.  (2002).  Eucalyptus plantations for sawlog production in Tasmania, Australia: optimising thinning regimes. Forestry Tasmania, Division of Forest Research and Development, Hobart, Tasmania, Australia.

2004
 Greave, B., Dutkowski, G., & McRae, T., 2004. Breeding Objectives for 'Eucalyptus globulus' for products other than Kraft pulp.  IUFRO Conference - Eucalyptus in a changing world.  Aveiro, Portugal 11–15 October 2015.
 Freudenberger D., Cawsey, E.M., Stol, J., & West, P.W., 2004. Sustainable firewood supply in the Murray-Darling Basin. CSIRO: Canberra. 
 Wardlaw, T., 2004. The impact of a single epidemic of Mycosphaerella leaf blight on the growth of Eucalyptus globulus. Division of Forest Research and Development, Technical Report 15/2004, Forestry Tasmania, Hobart.
 Warner, A., 2004. Farm-Level Blackwood Experience: Tasmanian Observations in Blackwood Management: Learning from New Zealand. Proceedings of an International Workshop, Rotorua, New Zealand, 22 November 2002. Edited by A.G. Brown.  A report for the RIRDC/Land & Water Australia/FWPRDC/MDBC Joint Venture Agroforestry Program July 2004. RIRDC Publication No 04/086.

2005
 Finnigan, J., and Poulton, R., 2005. Commercial tree growing options with the Tasmanian NAP region : a computer based strategic investigation.  Australian Forest Growers and Private Forests Tasmania, 2005 
 Volker, P., W., Greaves, B., & Wood, M,. Silvicultural Management of Eucalypt Plantation for Solid Wood and Engineered Wood Products - Experience from Tasmania, Australia in Plantation Eucalyptus: Challenge in Product Development:  Proceedings of the International Conference on Plantation Eucalyptus, Zhanjiang, Guangdong, China, November 28 - December 1, 2005.  Science Pres, Beijing.  Editors Li Xiuwei, Liu Jing, Gai Yu, Li Feng.  Chinese Research Institute of Wood Industry, China Eucalyptus Research Center.

2008
 Dickenson, I. 2008. Balancing the three-legged stool: a Case Study of Forest Conversion and Conservation in Biodiversity: Integrating Conservation and Production - Case Studies from Australian farms, forests and fisheries. Edited by. Lefroy, T. Baily, K. Unwin, G & Norton, T. CSIRO Publishing.

2009
 Baral, H., Kasel, S., Keenan, R., Fox, J., and Stork, N., 2009. GIS - based classification, mapping and valuation of ecosystem services in production landscapes: A case study of the Green Triangle region of south-eastern Australia. In: Forestry: a climate of change, Thistlethwaite, R., Lamb, D.,and Haines, R. (eds). pp. 64 –71. Proc. IFA Conference. Caloundra, Queensland, Australia, 6–10 September 2009.

2010
 Livingston, S., 2010. Wood Production Options:  Case Studies for Carbon Plantations – Extending R&D to best management practices for carbon sequestration, wood production and new investment opportunities on private land in Tasmania.  Funding from the Australian Government Department of Agriculture, Fisheries and Forestry under its Forest Industries Climate Change Research Fund program.

2011
 Roberts, S., Read, S., McLarin, M., & Admans, P., Predicting the water-use of Eucalyptus nitens plantations in Tasmania using a Forest Estate Model. Forest & Wood Products Australia, Project Number: PNC143.0809 September 2011.

 Morgan, H., 2011. Benefits of Restoring Skyline Tier Scamander Plantation, Tasmania. June 2011. Author Helen Morgan, Bushways Environmental Services – Tasmania.  Prepared for The North East Bioregional Network -  
 Wardlaw, T., 2011.  Managing Biotic Risk in Developing a Eucalypt Resource: Learning from Australia and Elsewhere.  Wood Technology Research Centre, Marlboro Research Centre, New Zealand. 2011, p 105 – 124.

2012
 Hydrological Impacts and Productivity Interactions of Integrated Oil Mallee Farming Systems: Landscape scale effects of dispersed mallee plantings. Edited by Kim Brooksbank.RIRDC Publication No. 11/161. RIRDC Project No. PRJ-000477 
 May, B.,  M.,Bulinski, J., Goodwin,.A & Macleod, S. Tasmanian Forest Carbon Study
 pitt&sherry. 2012 Potential Timber Production Estimate from the Tasmanian Private Plantation Estate. Prepared for: Independent Verification Group. Prepared by: pitt&sherry and Esk Mapping & GIS Services for February 2012.

2013
 Sohn, J., McElhinny, C., Hilbig,. E., Grove, S., and Bauhus, J., 2013.  A Simplified Inventory Approach for Estimating Carbon in Coarse Woody Debris in High Biomass Forests. Papers and Proceedings of the Royal Society of Tasmania, Volume 147, 2013 p 15-23.

2014
 Chan, H., 2014 A Case Study Using the Farm Forestry Toolbox to Determine Timber Volumes, Values and Financial Outcomes for Farm Forests. Presented at the Australian Forest Growers, National Farm Forestry Conference in Lismore, NSW. October 2014

See also

Deforestation
Forest farming
Forest informatics
Forestry
Private nonindustrial forest land

References

External links
 
 International Union of Forest Research Organisations
 Australian Agroforestry Foundation 
 Australian Forest Growers

Forestry in Australia
Forestry tools
Agroforestry
Environmental science software
Forest modelling